Syed Khwaja Khairuddin was a Pakistani politician. He was the vice mayor of Dhaka and was known for having opposed the Independence of Bangladesh. Following the country's liberation, he migrated to live in Pakistan.

Early life 
Khairuddin was born in Dhaka into the Muslim zamindari Nawab family on 4 July 1921. His father was Syed Khwaja Alauddin and mother was Shahzadi Begum. He studied at the Government Muslim High School in Dhaka and graduated from the University of Dhaka in 1943.

Career
He became the President of East Pakistan Council Muslim League. He served as the vice mayor of Dhaka. He was elected MPA in the year 1962–65 and was also elected MNA in the year 1965. He was a polling agent of Fatima Jinnah in Dhaka for the 1965 Pakistani presidential election which she contested for against President Ayub Khan. He was accused in the National Assembly of Pakistan for political bias in appointing personnel during his tenure as mayor. He was the convenor and chairman of East Pakistan Central Peace Committee. The committee faced accusations of war crimes, and one of its founders, Ghulam Azam, was convicted of war crimes. Khairuddin moved to Pakistan after the liberation of Bangladesh in 1971. After migrating to Pakistan, he served as Secretary General of the Movement for the Restoration of Democracy (MRD) which was an alliance of eight parties against President Zia-ul-Haq. Khairuddin was also a Senior Vice President of the Pakistan Muslim League. He was deported by Zulfikar Ali Bhutto for campaigning against the Unification of Pakistan. He was awarded a Sitara-e-Khidmat by Ayub Khan in 1963 and also awarded a gold medal by Prime Minister Nawaz Sharif for his role during the Pakistan Movement.

Legacy
He died 3 October 1993 in Karachi, Pakistan. Dr. Syed Khawaja Alqama, Khairuddin's son and the former vice chancellor of Bahauddin Zakariya University, was nominated to be Pakistan's High Commissioner to Bangladesh. The Government of Bangladesh declined to accept his nomination.

References

1921 births
1993 deaths
Members of the Dhaka Nawab family
Pakistani politicians
Pakistani people of Bengali descent
Mayors of Dhaka
University of Dhaka alumni
People from Karachi
20th-century Bengalis